A penumbral lunar eclipse took place at the Moon's ascending of the orbit on Sunday, June 5, 1955, with a penumbral eclipse magnitude of 0.62181 (62.181%). A penumbral lunar eclipse takes place when the Moon moves through the faint, outer part of Earth's shadow, the penumbra. This type of eclipse is not as dramatic as other types of lunar eclipses and is often mistaken for a regular Full Moon. The Moon shines because its surface reflects the Sun's rays. A lunar eclipse happens when the Earth comes between the Sun and the Moon and blocks some or all of the Sun's light from reaching the Moon. A penumbral lunar eclipse occurs when the Sun, Earth, and the Moon are imperfectly aligned. When this happens, the Earth blocks some of the Sun's light from directly reaching the Moon's surface and covers all or part of the Moon with the outer part of its shadow, also known as the penumbra. Since the penumbra is much fainter than the dark core of the Earth's shadow, the umbra, a penumbral eclipse of the Moon is often difficult to tell apart from a normal Full Moon. Occurring only 0.5 days after apogee (Apogee on June 5, 1955), the moon's apparent diameter was 6.5% smaller than average (1888 arcseconds).

Visibility
The penumbral eclipse was visible in Asia, Australia, Pacific, seen rising over Africa/western Indian Ocean and setting over the Pacific.

Related lunar eclipses

Lunar year series

Half-Saros cycle
A lunar eclipse will be preceded and followed by solar eclipses by 9 years and 5.5 days (a half saros). This lunar eclipse is related to two partial solar eclipses of Solar Saros 117.

See also
List of lunar eclipses
List of 20th-century lunar eclipses

Notes

External links

1955-06
1955 in science